Du glucose pour Noémie, written and drawn by Fournier, is the twentyfirst album of the Spirou et Fantasio series, and the author's second, following the Spirou retirement of André Franquin. The story was initially serialised in Spirou magazine before it was published, along with the short story Un faux départ, as a hardcover album in 1971.

Story
In Glucose for Noémie, the story continues where Le champignon nippon of the previous album left off. Ito Kata, a well-known Japanese conjuror, has entrusted Spirou and Fantasio with a special mushroom which he wants them to take back to their friend the Count of Champignac, a leading mycologist. The mushroom is also coveted by the Triangle, a SPECTRE-like, world-spanning criminal organization.

Having escaped the Triangle's agents, Spirou and Fantasio stand stunned at Tokyo airport when they find the parcel they were transporting empty...

In A False Departure, Spip is determined to run away from home.

Background
This album offers no explanation of Marsupilami's sudden absence (see Le faiseur d'or).

Ito Kata would become a regular secondary character during Fournier's run on the series.

References

 Fournier publications in Spirou BDoubliées

External links
 Spirou official site album index 

Glucose pour Noemie, Du
Works originally published in Spirou (magazine)
Literature first published in serial form
1971 books
1971 in comics
Comics set in Japan
Japan in non-Japanese culture